HMS Myrmidon was one of two s which served with the Royal Navy.

Design and construction
Myrmidon was laid down (as Yard number 751) on 23 October 1899, and was launched on 26 May 1900, completing in May 1901.

Myrmidon closely resembled , built by Palmers under the previous year's shipbuilding programme, and like Spiteful had four funnels. Displacement was  light and  full load.

Armament was a single QF 12 pounder 12 cwt gun on a platform on the ship's conning tower (in practice the platform was also used as the ship's bridge), backed up by five 6-pounder guns, and two 18 inch (450 mm) torpedo tubes.

Service history
Myrmidon was commissioned in August 1901 to serve on the Mediterranean Station. Commander Cecil Lambert was appointed in command in January 1902, and in September that year she was part of a squadron visiting Nauplia and Souda Bay off Crete for combined manoeuvres of the Mediterranean and Channel Fleets, during which she was declared as being sunk by the umpires of the exercise when she engaged two destroyers of an opposing fleet, mistaking them for torpedo boats. Myrmidon returned from the Mediterranean in 1905 and then served with the Atlantic Fleet for a year.

In September 1907, Myrmidon, based at Portsmouth as part of the First Destroyer Flotilla of the Channel Fleet, started a refit at Sheerness dockyard, with her boilers being retubed and her hull and machinery refurbished, with the refit completing in April 1908. Mrymidon was a member of the Fourth Destroyer Flotilla, based at Portsmouth, in 1910 and remained part of that Flotilla in 1912. On 30 August 1912 the Admiralty directed all destroyers were to be grouped into classes designated by letters based on contract speed and appearance. As a four-funneled 30-knotter destroyer, Myrmidon was assigned to the B Class.  In 1912, older destroyers were organised into Patrol Flotillas, with Myrmidon being part of the 6th Flotilla, based at Portsmouth, in March 1913.  She remained part of the 6th Flotilla in July 1914, on the eve of the outbreak of the First World War.

First World War
The 6th Flotilla mobilised and transferred to its war station at Dover (as part of the Dover Patrol) on 31 July–1 August 1914. The Flotilla's role was to prevent German warships from passing into the English Channel. Myrmidon was operating off the Belgian coast on 24 October 1914 when she reported being attacked by a submarine.

Myrmidon remained part of the 6th Flotilla at the beginning of March 1917. Myrmidon sank after a collision with the merchant ship Hamborn on 26 March 1917 off Dungeness.

Notes

References

Bibliography
 
 
 
 
 
 
 
 
 
 
 
 
 

 

Myrmidon-class destroyers
Ships built on the River Tyne
1900 ships
B-class destroyers (1913)
World War I destroyers of the United Kingdom
Maritime incidents in 1917
Ships sunk in collisions
World War I shipwrecks in the English Channel